Sosha Makani (born 18 November 1986) is an Iranian football goalkeeper who currently plays for Norwegian football club Mjøndalen. Makani also played for the Iran national football team.

Club career

Fajr Sepasi
Makani started his career with Fajr Sepasi and stayed at the club for two seasons. He played 42 matches for the club and also scored a goal.

Pas Hamedan
He joined Pas Hamedan in the summer of 2008 and signed a two-year contract keeping him at the club until the end of the 2009–10 season. He ended up playing 44 games for the club.

Steel Azin
He joined Steel Azin in the summer of 2010 and signed a one-year contract keeping him at the club until the end of the 2010–11 season. He only featured in 10 games for the club.

Naft Tehran
He joined Naft Tehran in the summer of 2011 signing a three-year contract with the club keeping him there until the end of the 2013–14 season. He played 56 games for the club.

Foolad
Makani joined Foolad during the winter transfer window of the 2013–14 season. Makani helped Foolad win the 2013–14 Iran Pro League title, and also reach the knockout stages of the 2014 AFC Champions League.

Persepolis
After becoming the Pro League's champions with Foolad and also recording 13 clean sheets in 2013–14 Iran Pro League the fourth best in the league. Makani decided to join Persepolis in the summer of 2014 and signed a two-year contract keeping him at the club until the end of 2015–16 season. Makani became the starter for the club in the middle of the 2014–15 season after then-manager Hamid Derakhshan decided to sell Perspolis' first choice goalkeeper Nilson Correa Junior.

Mjøndalen
On 21 June 2016, Makani joined Mjøndalen for a one-week trial. After a successful trial Makani on 30 June 2016 signed a two-and-a-half-year contract with the club. Makani made his debut for Mjøndalen on 7 August 2016, keeping a clean sheet in a 0–0 draw at home against Ullensaker/Kisa.

Strømsgodset
On 25 January 2017, Makani signed for Strømsgodset on loan until 14 August 2017.

International career

Under-23
Makani has played 6 games for the Iran national under-23 football team.

Senior
In 2012 Makani was invited to the Iranian national team by Carlos Queiroz to play in the 2012 WAFF Championship.

Makani was suspended for the opening game vs. Nigeria in the 2014 FIFA World Cup after the World Cup qualifying post-match altercation against South Korea on 18 June 2013. He was selected in Iran's 30-man provisional squad for the 2014 FIFA World Cup by Carlos Queiroz. However, he was not included in the final list.

Controversy
On 4 January 2016, Makani was arrested for posting pictures on social media that displayed two unveiled women. The photos were deemed to be anti-Islamic, and the arrest came following an alleged complaint by private plaintiffs. The official charge against Makani was, "publishing pictures that lead to the spread of corruption and prostitution in society". However, Makani's lawyer contested that his social media accounts had been hacked and that the information was posted by two other individuals. Makani was sent to Evin Prison but was released shortly later and returned to Persepolis training in early 2016. On 8 June 2016, Makani was suspended for six months from playing football by the Disciplinary Committee.

Club career statistics

Honours
Foolad
Persian Gulf Pro League: 2013–14

References

External links
Sosha Makani On Instagram

1986 births
Living people
People from Bandar-e Anzali
Iranian footballers
Iranian expatriate footballers
Iran international footballers
Fajr Sepasi players
PAS Hamedan F.C. players
Steel Azin F.C. players
Naft Tehran F.C. players
Foolad FC players
Persepolis F.C. players
Mjøndalen IF players
Strømsgodset Toppfotball players
Sanat Naft Abadan F.C. players
Naft Masjed Soleyman F.C. players
Persian Gulf Pro League players
Norwegian First Division players
Eliteserien players
Association football goalkeepers
Iranian expatriate sportspeople in Norway
Expatriate footballers in Norway
Sportspeople from Gilan province